Manassas Regional Airport  (Harry P. Davis Field) is five miles southwest of the center of Manassas.

History

An airport for Manassas was proposed in 1930, when the mayor was Harry P. Davis. It was built in 1931 on  along Virginia Route 234, in the area now known as Manaport Shopping Center. Originally owned privately, the Town of Manassas bought the airport in 1945. Due to airport activity and nearby housing development, the airport moved to its current location in 1964. The new airport opened with a single  paved runway. In 1992, the city purchased a control tower from Centennial Airport near Denver and reassembled it at Manassas Regional Airport. A new terminal was built in 1996.

The airport saw commercial airline service by Colgan Airways in the 1970s and 1980s with flights to the Washington Dulles International Airport.
Colgan was based at the Manassas airport and flew Beechcraft 99 and Beechcraft 1900 commuter aircraft. From late 1985 through early 1987 Colgan teamed up with New York Air and was known as New York Air Connection providing feeder flights for the larger carrier. In early 1987 New York Air merged into Continental Airlines and Colgan operated as a Continental Express feeder carrier however service to Manassas ended a short time later. Colgan returned to Manassas for a period of time in the mid 1990s operating under their own brand and providing flights to Washington Dulles.

Facilities
It has two asphalt runways: 16L/34R is 6,200 x 100 feet (1,737 x 30 m) and 16R/34L is 3,715 x 75 feet (1,132 x 29 m).

In the year ending December 2011 the airport had 85,000 aircraft operations, average 236 per day: 98% general aviation, 1% air taxi and 1% military. 401 aircraft were then based at this airport: 78% single-engine, 10% multi-engine, 7% jet and 5% helicopter.

Manassas houses 26 businesses operating onsite ranging from maintenance, flight schools, aircraft charter, and avionics. APP Jet Center and Chantilly Air are the airport's two fixed base operators with Chantilly Air opening in March, 2021. Dulles Aviation had previously ran the 1st FBO at the airport from the 1980s until closing its doors in May 2019 and was responsible for a lot of the airport's growth.

See also 

Broad Run/Airport (VRE station)
Colgan Air (headquarters formerly located on airport grounds)
City of Manassas

References

External links 
 https://web.archive.org/web/20150209203757/http://www.aviationacrossamerica.com/manassas-regional-airport-celebrates-50-years/

 Manassas Regional Airport at City of Manassas website
 Bussmann Aviation
 
 

Airports in Virginia
Transportation in Prince William County, Virginia
Buildings and structures in Manassas, Virginia
1931 establishments in Virginia
Airports established in 1931
1964 establishments in Virginia
Airports established in 1964